Qomik may refer to:

 Qom Yek-e Kuchak
 Qomik-e Bozorg